The Veskanda C1 (more commonly known as just "Veskanda") is a one-off, Australian designed and built, mid-engined closed top racing car built in 1985 to CAMS Group A Sports Car specifications. Powered by a Chevrolet V8 engine, the car is generally regarded as the fastest sports car ever built in Australia and as of 2016 remains one of Australia's fastest  race cars.

Concept
In December 1984, Australia held its first ever FIA World Championship motor racing event, a 1000 km World Endurance Championship event at Melbourne's Sandown Raceway (pre-dating the 1985 Australian Grand Prix Formula One race in Adelaide by 11 months). One of the spectators at the event was Adelaide based Australian Sports Car Championship competitor and professional photographer Bernie van Elsen who was inspired to build an Australian Group C sports car. At the time it was to be the first of three WSC races at Sandown, but the 1985 and 1986 races which van Elsen planned to enter with the car were eventually canceled.

Build
Van Elsen commissioned Adelaide based engineering firm K&A Engineering run by Dale Koennecke (a former engineer for Garrie Cooper's Ansett Team Elfin) and Harry Aust to build a Ground effect racing sports car that not only complied to CAMS Group A rules but also to the FIA's Group C rules while also being compliant to the American IMSA GT Championship regulations. K&A were already prominent in Australian motor racing having rebuilt John Briggs' rapid Dekon Chevrolet Monza which had raced in the national Sports Sedan and GT championships during the early 1980s, and most notably the Don Elliot owned Alfa Romeo Alfetta GTV (originally powered by a Repco Holden V8 and later a 5.0 and 6.0 litre Chevrolet) that Tony Edmonson drove to win the 1980 and 1981 Australian Sports Car titles.

The Veskanda also featured an aluminum monocoque and a Porsche 956 style full width rear wing (a small front wing was also used when extra downforce was needed), and to comply with the Group C and IMSA GTP regulations featured the pedal box behind the front axle. The car was completed with a full fibreglass body.

The car, named the VESKANDA (for Van Elsen Special K AND A), was the second closed top, ground effect racing sports car built in Australia following on from the Romano WE84 designed and built by Queensland based Kaditcha owner Barry Lock in 1982. The Romano, which started life named the Kaditcha K583, was powered by a, ex-McLaren Cosworth DFV Formula One V8 engine and had dominated the 1984 Australian Sports Car Championship in the hands of its owner Bap Romano (van Elsen had finished 28th in the championship driving a Bolwell Nagari). By the time the Veskanda was debuted in 1985, Romano had upgraded from the 3.0 L Cosworth engine to a 3.9 L Cosworth DFL V8 engine developed for sports car racing.

Racing

1985
The Veskanda was completed by June 1985 and van Elsen enlisted the services of 1984 and 1985 CAMS Gold Star winner John Bowe to drive the car in the 1985 Australian Sports Car Championship. After a test crash at the Adelaide International Raceway (caused by wheel failure) put back the cars debut by two months, Bowe debuted the car in Round 4 of the series at AIR. Bowe would take his first win in the series in the next round at Calder Park in Melbourne, easily defeating the previously dominant Kaditcha Chevrolet of Chris Clearihan (the eventual series champion) and the Lola T610 Chevrolet of Terry Hook. Bowe's late series run would see him finish 7th in the championship.

1986
Like most Chevrolet users in the championship, van Elsen chose the 5.8 litre engine rather than a 6.0 litre engine due to the fuel limit per race imposed by CAMS (bringing the championship in line with the FIA's WSC regulations). With the new power plant in the Veskanda, Bowe would completely dominate the 1986 ASCC. He scored pole position at all 5 rounds, won all 7 races that made up the championship and set fastest lap in each race (all class lap records), including outright circuit records at Calder Park and the fast Surfers Paradise International Raceway.

Bowe finished the championship with a maximum 120 points, 34.5 points clear of second placed Terry Hook's Lola T610 Chevrolet and 42.5 clear of reigning champion Chris Clearihan driving his Kaditcha Chevrolet. As of August 2016, Bowe's outright lap record at the 2.280 km (1.417 mi) Calder Park circuit (52.69) has yet to be beaten, while his record lap at the 3.219 km (2.000 mi) Surfers Paradise circuit (1:04.3) was not beaten by the time the circuit closed in 1987.

1987
Bowe and the Veskanda were again expected to dominate the 1987 Australian Sports Car Championship which was only run over 3 rounds after the 3 final rounds were canceled due to a lack of entries (which some blamed on the Veskanda's dominance). However, engine problems in the wet opening round at Calder Park meant winning back to back titles was a long shot. Bowe would bounce back in rounds 2 and 3 at Amaroo Park and Sandown and would eventually finish 2nd in the championship, 19 points behind Andy Roberts in his self-designed Roberts SR3 powered by a 1.6 litre Ford engine. Under CAMS point scoring rules which gave extra points for lower capacity cars finishing in outright positions, Roberts scored more points (27) for finishing 2nd at Amaroo than Bowe who scored 25 points for winning the race. This and finishing in 4th place in the opening and final rounds allowed Roberts to claim the championship.

Bowe's win at Amaroo Park also saw him set the circuit's outright lap record with a 44.36 second lap. This time would remain the outright lap record for the circuit until it closed in 1998.

1988
With John Bowe moving to drive the higher profile (in Australia) Group A touring cars full-time in 1988, van Elsen did not enter the Veskanda in the 1988 Australian Sports Car Championship which (as of 2016) would prove to be the final Australian Sports Car Championship ever run. The car did run in some local South Australian based sports car and sports sedan races through the year including being driven by noted Adelaide sports sedan racer Mick Monterosso who set the short circuit lap record in the car at the Adelaide International Raceway.

After the canceled 1985 and 1986 World Sportscar Championship races (and a rumoured WSC race at Surfers Paradise in 1986 which eventually fell through), Sandown in Melbourne was again to host the final round of the 1988 World Sportscar Championship. Unlike the 1984 race, the FIA did not allow Australian sports cars and sports sedans to enter the event as they did not conform to the WSC regulations. However, as his car did comply to the regulations, van Elsen entered the Veskanda and again enlisted John Bowe to drive. Bowe was partnered in the event, the 360 km of Sandown Park by his touring car teammate and boss, reigning (and then 4 time) Australian Touring Car Champion Dick Johnson who had driven in the 1984 race driving a similarly powered (6.0 L) Chevrolet Monza.

For the event, the Veskanda was upgraded to a 6.0 L Chevrolet V8 engine. Against the world's leading sports cars including the 7.0 L V12 powered Jaguar XJR-9's from Tom Walkinshaw Racing, the turbocharged 5.0 L Mercedes-Benz V8 powered Sauber C9's and the Porsche 962's, Bowe qualified the car in a credible 8th place with a time of 1:35.510, though he was some 6.89 seconds behind the pole winning Sauber C9 of Frenchman Jean-Louis Schlesser (Bowe's time was 2.89 seconds faster than the fastest Australian qualifier in the 1984 race, Alfredo Costanzo in the Romano Cosworth). Bowe and Johnson would eventually finish in 8th place, 6 laps behind the Schlesser / Jochen Mass Sauber Mercedes but were later disqualified for exceeding the fuel allowance limit (ironically giving Johnson his second WSC DQ in two races as the Monza he drove in 1984 had been disqualified for receiving outside assistance from the track marshals).

With CAMS closing the Australian Sports Car Championship following 1988 and the Sandown World Championship race again proving to be a one-off, the 1988 360 km of Sandown Park would prove to be the Veskanda's final competitive race.

Post racing
In the following years, the Veskanda remained dormant until it was purchased by former Sports Sedan racer John Briggs who restored the car. It make a welcome on-track return at the Historic Sandown meeting in 2007 (with what Briggs described as a "very tired" 5.8 L V8 engine installed). Brigg's later got the chance to run it against other historic sports cars (including the Porsche 956) at the Phillip Island Classic meeting in 2011.

Driving in the Group C - C1 historic sports car series which raced at such tracks as Le Mans, Silverstone, Donington, Nürburgring, Imola, Paul Ricard and Spa-Francorchamps, Stubber finished in 10th place in 2012 and 5th place in 2013.

The , 6.0 L Chevrolet V8 currently in the Veskanda was built by KRE Race Engines in Queensland. KRE are better known in Australia as engine builders for both V8 Supercars as well as a number of Australia's top Sprintcars.

Race wins

Overall
 Australian Sports Car Championship - 1985 (x1), 1986 (x7), 1987 (x2)

Series wins
 Australian Sports Car Championship - 1986

References

Cars of Australia
1980s cars
Group C cars